Daniel Ray Herrera (born October 21, 1984) is an American former  professional baseball pitcher. He played in Major League Baseball (MLB) for the Cincinnati Reds, Milwaukee Brewers and New York Mets.

Herrera became well known among baseball fans both for his small stature and for his unique pitch repertoire. He was one of the smallest pitchers in recent Major League Baseball history at 5' 6", and one of the few to throw a true screwball.

Playing career
Herrera attended Permian High School in Odessa, Texas. Undrafted out of high school, he was chosen by the Texas Rangers in the 45th round of the 2006 Major League Baseball draft out of the University of New Mexico, where he played for the New Mexico Lobos baseball team. It was in college that Herrera developed his screwball (out of dissatisfaction with his changeup).

Cincinnati Reds
On December 21, Herrera was traded by the Rangers along with Edinson Vólquez to the Cincinnati Reds for Josh Hamilton.

He made his Major League debut on June 3, pitching a scoreless inning. Entering the game with men on base and no outs, he induced Shane Victorino to ground out, and after an intentional walk to Chase Utley he struck out both Ryan Howard and Pat Burrell. Two days after his debut, he was optioned back to AAA Louisville to make room on the roster for starting pitcher Homer Bailey.

He was briefly recalled again on June 10, 2008; however, he was sent down just four days later when pitcher Gary Majewski returned from the bereavement list. He made just one appearance during his second stint, pitching two innings while giving up three runs on four hits, striking out two.

In 2009, Herrera made the Reds out of spring training. He recorded his first victory of his career on June 16, 2009 after relieving Aaron Harang in the top of the third inning following an extended rain delay. He pitched three scoreless innings, giving up two hits while striking out two.

Milwaukee Brewers
On May 23, 2011, Herrera was claimed off waivers by the Milwaukee Brewers and optioned to the Nashville Sounds. He was designated for assignment on June 17, after making two appearances with Milwaukee.

New York Mets
On September 1, 2011, Herrera was named as one of the players to be named later that completed the July 12, 2011 trade for Francisco Rodríguez. On January 9, 2012, the Mets placed Herrera on waivers. On April 3, 2012 he was optioned to the Buffalo Bisons.

The Mets released Herrera in March 2013.

Camden Riversharks
Herrera signed with the Camden Riversharks of the Atlantic League of Professional Baseball for the 2014 season.

He became a free agent after the 2015 season.

Pitching style
Herrera threw six pitches. He had three fastballs — a four-seamer (83–86 mph, topped out at 88), a two-seamer (82–85), and a cutter (81–84) — as well as a curveball (75–78), a changeup (75–77), and a screwball (67–70). Herrera threw all of his pitches to hitters from both sides of the plate, with the exception of the changeup (which was only used against right-handed hitters). The screwball was his most common pitch in 2-strike counts, especially to righties. His most common pitch against left-handers as a whole was his curveball.

References

External links

1984 births
Living people
Cincinnati Reds players
Milwaukee Brewers players
New York Mets players
Baseball players from Texas
People from Odessa, Texas
Major League Baseball pitchers
Arizona League Rangers players
Bakersfield Blaze players
Frisco RoughRiders players
Surprise Rafters players
Chattanooga Lookouts players
Louisville Bats players
Nashville Sounds players
New Mexico Lobos baseball players
Buffalo Bisons (minor league) players
Screwball pitchers
Long Island Ducks players
Somerset Patriots players
Águilas de Mexicali players
American expatriate baseball players in Mexico
Camden Riversharks players
La Crosse Loggers players